Villa General Belgrano is a mountain village at the valley of Calamuchita in the Province of Córdoba in central Argentina. It has 6,260 inhabitants and is named after the independence hero and creator of the Argentine flag Manuel Belgrano.

History
Villa General Belgrano was founded in 1930, by two German speculators attracted by its agricultural potential. The Alpine quality of the village attracted immigrants from Germany, Switzerland, Italy and Austria.

In 1940, after the Battle of the River Plate, German seaman scuttled and sunk their battleship, the Admiral Graf Spee off the coast of the Montevideo harbour, and 130 of its surviving sailors settled in the village along with the original settlers and landscaped the mountain ranges of Córdoba with red-roofed, wood-frame homes, microbreweries and pastry and chocolate shops which gave it that unique style that distinguishes it today. A well-known German resident was Kurt Tank, who became a leading member of the Argentine Aeronautic Institute.

The village, characterized by its typically Bavarian style architecture, survives on a steady flow of tourists with an appetite for German delicacies like apple strudel, leberwurst and spätzle and beer even if German cuisine recipes are not strictly respected by local restaurants. Oktoberfest here is hailed as the third-most important Oktoberfest site after Munich and Blumenau in Brazil. The village offers an above-average (considering surrounding villages) quality of accommodations to the visitors in hotels and cabins, including a local Howard Johnson's.

Newsstands sell the German language weekly, Argentinisches Tageblatt among other German newspapers, and the church offers Sunday services in German and Spanish. Like many isolated immigrant communities, Villa General Belgrano has respected traditions that fell out of favor in Germany long ago, however even though the mother tongue can still be heard, it is being lost in time.

Flora and fauna
The flora in this area has many arboreal autochthonous species as the chañar, espinillio, molle, moradillo, shade of bull and piquillín amongst other. As for the species implemented by the man in the zone important plantations of coniferous, eucalyptuses, paradise, acacias, are found.
As for the fauna, gray foxes, partridges, vizcachas, cuises, shy iguanas, weasels, etc. are abundant.
The commune is in the region named Bosque Serrano, located between 500 and 1400 metres above sea level.

Nearby towns
The nearby town of Santa Rosa de Calamuchita, together with Villa General Belgrano are the principal tourist localities of the Valley. Nearby there also are the small settlements of Los Reartes, Villa Ciudad Parque Los Reartes, Solar de los Molinos, Villa Berna, Villa Alpina, Capilla Vieja, Atos Pampa, and La Cumbrecita which are singular tourist attractions.

Education
The area once had a German school, Colegio Aleman "Steck".

See also

 La Cumbrecita

References

External links

Information about building regulations in Villa General Belgrano (Spanish)

Austrian diaspora
German-Argentine culture
Italian-Argentine culture
Swiss-Argentine culture
Populated places in Córdoba Province, Argentina
Populated places established in 1930
Tourism in Argentina
1930 establishments in Argentina
Cities in Argentina
Argentina
Córdoba Province, Argentina